Shahanaz Parvin (born 15 August 1991) is a Bangladeshi former cricketer who played as a right-handed batter and a right-arm off break bowler. She appeared in two One Day Internationals and two Twenty20 Internationals for Bangladesh in 2013, all against India. She played domestic cricket for Rangpur Division and Khulna Division.

References

External links
 
 

1991 births
Living people
Bangladeshi women cricketers
Bangladesh women One Day International cricketers
Bangladesh women Twenty20 International cricketers
Asian Games medalists in cricket
Cricketers at the 2014 Asian Games
Asian Games silver medalists for Bangladesh
Medalists at the 2014 Asian Games
Rangpur Division women cricketers
Khulna Division women cricketers